Kia Connect, formerly UVO eServices, is a paid subscription OEM infotainment and telematics service offered by Kia Motors America on select vehicles for the United States market. The system allows users to make hands-free calls on their smartphone, stream music, navigate to a POI, and perform vehicle diagnostics with the use of voice commands.

The integrated in-vehicle communications and entertainment system is developed by Kia Motors and other third-party developers.

Overview

First launched in the 2011 model year, Kia's UVO entertainment system included the HD radio, CD player, and a built-in digital jukebox. The system also interfaces with Bluetooth-enabled phones and utilizes touchscreen and voice command technology.

The UVO system is driven by vehicle communications with a smartphone application. Data transfers from the vehicle to the smartphone application utilize the customer's mobile carrier resulting in a subscription-free telematics service. Users of the system are able to interact with their vehicle to retrieve diagnostic trouble codes. Users can also load a point of interest to the vehicle's head unit. Other technologies like GPS and interactive voice response are also integrated into the system.

Users are able to access the vehicle data on the smartphone application and through a customer web portal. In the 2015 model year, select vehicles launched with an Android-based  operating platform to allow flexibility to integrate 3rd-party applications. Certain vehicles have USB (for model years 2014 and later) and Wi-Fi connectivity (for model years 2015 and later).

The service was renamed Kia Connect in September 2021.

Infotainment features
The below table provides a short description of UVO eServices features. Feature availability depends on model and model year.

In-vehicle apps
Beginning with the 2015 Optima, the UVO eServices with 8" Nav system allows users to download applications from the UVO download center for in-vehicle use via the head unit. Currently, Yelp is available in the UVO download center.

3rd party features
Beginning with 2015 Optima, the UVO eServices with 8" Nav system allows users to connect the vehicle head unit to a WiFi hotspot. Once connected to WiFi, most vehicles can access Google local search via a button on the steering wheel to search for POIs via voice recognition. The 2015 UVO eServices with 8" Nav system also supports Siri Eyes Free which allows users to access Siri via a button on the steering wheel for supported Apple devices.

MyUVO.com
Owners of UVO equipped vehicles can register for an account on www.myuvo.com to view information related to their vehicle. Vehicle information available includes vehicle diagnostics, trip info, MyCarZone, and MyPOIs. In addition to viewing vehicle information, users can also view the maintenance schedule for their vehicle and schedule appointments with a dealer. Also, users can earn awards by actively using the website.

Smartphone app

The UVO smartphone app is available in the iTunes and Google Play stores. The app interfaces with the vehicle through a USB or Bluetooth connection. The UVO eServices with 8" Nav head unit requires a USB connection to transfer telematics data, while others use Bluetooth for data transfer. All head units can connect with Bluetooth for phone and audio functions.

2014 re-design

In 2014, the app was re-skinned and new features were added. On compatible 2015 vehicles, the UVO app will display trip information and My Car Zone.

Data transfer

The UVO app serves as a web interface for vehicles that do not have embedded web capabilities. Data is transferred from the UVO head unit to the app via Bluetooth or USB, which is then transferred to the web and viewable from both the app and the web.

UVO versions

UVO

The original UVO was released on 2011 vehicles. Features include voice commands, Bluetooth, jukebox, and a rear-view camera. UVO was replaced by UVO eServices on most models by the 2014 model year. Although the standard version was discontinued, it is still used in 2015 LX, EX Sedonas.

UVO eServices

UVO eServices was the first UVO to interface with MyUVO.com and the UVO mobile app. It was introduced on 2013 model year Optima, Optima Hybrid, and Sportage. In addition to having all of the features on the original UVO, UVO eServices has Parking Minder, Enhanced Roadside Assist, and Vehicle Diagnostics. On 2015 model year vehicles, Trip Info and My Car Zone features are included.

UVO eServices with 7" Nav

UVO eServices with 7" Nav was introduced alongside UVO eServices on some 2013 models. In addition to all of the features of UVO and UVO eServices, the 7" Nav version has Navigation and My POIs. On 2015 model year vehicles, Trip Info and My Car Zone are included.

UVO eServices with 8" Nav

UVO eServices with 8" Nav was introduced on the 2014 Soul. It has all of the features of UVO eServices with 7" Nav, the larger screen accepts swipe gestures, and features are organized in the way that apps are organized on a tablet.

On September 22, 2014, an update for the 2014 Soul UVO with Nav system was released which unlocks the eServices including My Car Zone, Vehicle Diagnostics, and 911 Connect. It also includes updated maps and improved navigation features, as well as Siri Eyes-Free.

UVO Premium

UVO Premium was designed specifically for the 2015 K900. It shares most of its features with UVO eServices with 7" Nav. It comes with a completely redesigned user interface and the touch screen from other UVO versions is replaced with a controller wheel on the center console.

Vehicles offering UVO
The following vehicles are UVO capable, available as either an optional or standard feature. The date next to each vehicle indicates in which model year UVO was first available on that specific vehicle. On some models, UVO is not available on all trim levels.

North America:

 Kia K900: 2015 and newer
 Kia Sedona: 2015 and newer (current 2015 models available in dealerships without Navigation – LX, EX, do not offer UVO with e-services as standard as stated in the brochure; only the basic UVO which was discontinued; Kia is unable to confirm when 2015 EX, LX models with UVO e-services w/o Nav will be produced)
 Kia Cadenza: 2014 and newer
 Kia Soul: 2011 and newer
 Kia Sorento: 2011 and newer
 Kia Optima: 2011 and newer
 Kia Optima Hybrid: 2011 and newer
 Kia Forte: 2017 and newer
 Kia Sportage: 2011 and newer
 Kia Rio: 2011 and newer
 Kia Sedona: 2015 and newer – Si and above have larger LCDs
 Kia Niro: 2017 and newer
Kia Stinger: 2018 and newer
 Kia Telluride: 2020 and newer
 Kia Seltos: 2021 and newer
India
 Kia Sonet: 2020 and newer
 Kia Carens: 2022 and newer

References

External links
 

Automotive technology tradenames
Human–computer interaction
In-car entertainment
Kia Motors
Vehicle technology
Vehicle telematics